= Umu Oma =

Village in Imo state, Nigeria

Umu Oma is a village in southeastern Nigeria near the city of Owerri.
